Cessaniti is a comune (municipality) in the Province of Vibo Valentia in the Italian region Calabria, located about  southwest of Catanzaro and about  west of Vibo Valentia.

The municipality of Cessaniti contains the frazioni (subdivisions, mainly villages and hamlets) Favelloni, Mantineo, Pannaconi, Piana Pugliese, San Cono, and San Marco.

Cessaniti borders the following municipalities: Briatico, Filandari, Vibo Valentia, Zungri.

References

Cities and towns in Calabria